Pavolini is a surname. Notable people with the surname include:

Alessandro Pavolini (1903–1945), Italian politician, journalist and essayist
Corrado Pavolini (1898–1980), Italian writer
 (1864–1942), Italian poet

See also
Pasolini (surname)